The White Flags, also known as Sufyaniyyun, are a militant Kurdish Islamonationalist group which are an offshoot of Ansar al-Islam. They are based in the disputed territories of northern Iraq opposed to the Iraqi government. Their appearance was first noted during the Battle of Kirkuk in October 2017, when the Jambur oil facility was secured by Iraqi forces in October 2017 as the federal government regained control of disputed territories which were taken by the Kurdish Regional Government.

Ideology 
Iraqi civil and military officials as well as regional experts, claim that the White Flags are a Kurdish nationalist or separatist faction which was founded in response to the Iraqi takeover of Kirkuk, with its members referring to themselves as "the Kurdish resistance". U.S. defense and military officials also said that it "appears to be a union of Kurdish terrorists and former ISIS fighters", or a union of Kurdish ISIS and Ansar al-Islam remnants. Iraqi intelligence and Bill Roggio said that the group could possibly be a re-branding attempt by a faction of Ansar al-Islam, or even a Kurdish movement to oppose the Iraqi government. The Iraqi government said that the White Flags are a Front organization of Ansar al-Islam.

All those claims was supported by the fact that the White Flags leader and founder, Assi al-Qawali, was a staunch KDP supporter and an Islamist. He also had close ties to Mullah Krekar and various ISIS members. The variant flag of the White Flags has "Ansar al-Islam movement" written on top of it.

The Peshmerga and the Kurdish Government deny claims that they support this group.

Organisation and tactics 
The White Flags are considered to be a terrorist organization by Iraqi officials. In late 2017, an Iraqi-Turkmen MP accused Kurdish leaders of supporting the group. This was denied by the Kurdistan Regional Government. The group's leader Hiwa Chor, a one-eyed militant in his early forties,  was a former member of al-Qaeda in Iraq but disagreed with ISIL's ambitious Caliphate plans so left the organization with a Turkman militant from the Diyala Governorate. The group uses various guerilla tactics such as ambushes and utilizes IEDs. It also uses mortars and rockets. The group operates in and around Tuz Khurmatu, has launched frequent attacks on oil fields and routes in the area.

See also
Ansar al-Islam
Kurdistan Brigades
Rawti Shax

References

Salafi Jihadist groups
Qutbist organisations
Kurdish Islamic organisations
Kurdish Islamism
Jihadist groups in Iraq
Rebel groups in Iraq
2017 establishments in Iraq
Organizations designated as terrorist by Iraq
Organizations based in Asia designated as terrorist
Guerrilla organizations